Tarmo Saks (born 6 November 1975) is a retired football forward from Estonia. He played for several clubs in his native country, including FC Kuressaare and FC Flora Tallinn.

International career
Saks earned his first official cap for the Estonia national football team on 29 July 1994, when Estonia played Lithuania at the Baltic Cup 1994. He obtained a total number of five caps.

References

1975 births
Living people
Estonian footballers
Estonia international footballers
Association football forwards
FC Kuressaare players
FC Flora players
Footballers from Tallinn